One third of City of Bradford Metropolitan District Council is elected each year, followed by one year without election.

Political control
From 1889 until 1974 Bradford was a county borough, independent from any county council. Under the Local Government Act 1972 it had its territory enlarged and became a metropolitan borough, with West Yorkshire County Council providing county-level services. The first election to the reconstituted city council was held in 1973, initially operating as a shadow authority before coming into its revised powers on 1 April 1974. West Yorkshire County Council was abolished in 1986 and Bradford became a unitary authority. Political control of the council since 1973 has been held by the following parties:

Leadership
The leaders of the council since 1979 have been:

Council elections
1973 City of Bradford Metropolitan District Council election
1975 City of Bradford Metropolitan District Council election
1976 City of Bradford Metropolitan District Council election
1978 City of Bradford Metropolitan District Council election
1979 City of Bradford Metropolitan District Council election
1980 City of Bradford Metropolitan District Council election
1982 City of Bradford Metropolitan District Council election
1983 City of Bradford Metropolitan District Council election
1984 City of Bradford Metropolitan District Council election
1986 City of Bradford Metropolitan District Council election
1987 City of Bradford Metropolitan District Council election
1988 City of Bradford Metropolitan District Council election
1990 City of Bradford Metropolitan District Council election
1991 City of Bradford Metropolitan District Council election
1992 City of Bradford Metropolitan District Council election
1994 City of Bradford Metropolitan District Council election
1995 City of Bradford Metropolitan District Council election
1996 City of Bradford Metropolitan District Council election
1998 City of Bradford Metropolitan District Council election
1999 City of Bradford Metropolitan District Council election
2000 City of Bradford Metropolitan District Council election
2002 City of Bradford Metropolitan District Council election
2003 City of Bradford Metropolitan District Council election
2004 City of Bradford Metropolitan District Council election
2006 City of Bradford Metropolitan District Council election
2007 City of Bradford Metropolitan District Council election
2008 City of Bradford Metropolitan District Council election
2010 City of Bradford Metropolitan District Council election
2011 City of Bradford Metropolitan District Council election 
2012 City of Bradford Metropolitan District Council election
2014 City of Bradford Metropolitan District Council election
2015 City of Bradford Metropolitan District Council election
2016 City of Bradford Metropolitan District Council election
2018 City of Bradford Metropolitan District Council election
2019 City of Bradford Metropolitan District Council election
2021 City of Bradford Metropolitan District Council election
2022 City of Bradford Metropolitan District Council election

District result maps

By-election results

References

External links
City of Bradford Metropolitan District Council

 
Council elections in West Yorkshire
Elections in Bradford
Local government in Bradford
Metropolitan borough council elections in England